The University Sports Complex or The Den is a 500-seat multi-purpose arena in New Orleans, Louisiana, United States, on the campus of Loyola University New Orleans. It was formerly called the Recreational Sports Complex or Rec Plex.

History
The facility opened in 1987 and was paid for with a donation from Freeport-McMoRan. The complex is located on the fifth and sixth floors of the Freret Street parking garage structure. It was built on the same site as the former Loyola Field House.

In 2017, the facility went through a major renovation, including new floor paint, new grandstands and more.

Athletic teams
It is home to the Loyola Wolf Pack men's basketball, women's basketball, men's swimming, women's swimming and women's volleyball teams. The facility offers both men's and women's locker rooms for the teams. The facility also houses the offices for the Wolf Pack Athletics Department.

Recreational sports
The University Sports Complex also serves as the student recreation center. The facility offers multi-purpose courts used for badminton, basketball, soccer, tennis and volleyball. It also has a racquetball court, a six-lane Olympic-style pool, a suspended track, a weightlifting/conditioning area, a whirlpool, sauna and steam room.

See also
 Loyola Wolf Pack
 Loyola University New Orleans

References

External links
 Official website

College basketball venues in the United States
College swimming venues in the United States
College volleyball venues in the United States
Athletics (track and field) venues in New Orleans
Basketball venues in New Orleans
Indoor arenas in New Orleans
Indoor track and field venues in Louisiana
Swimming venues in New Orleans
Volleyball venues in New Orleans
Loyola University New Orleans
Loyola Wolf Pack
Loyola Wolf Pack men's basketball
Sports venues completed in 1987
1987 establishments in Louisiana